José María Merchán Illanes (born 7 July 1976 in Seville) is a Spanish triathlete.

Merchan competed in the first Olympic triathlon at the 2000 Summer Olympics Sydney 2000.  He did not finish the competition because of a fall in the bicycle sector.

Notes

References

External links
 
 
 

1976 births
Living people
Spanish male triathletes
Triathletes at the 2000 Summer Olympics
Olympic triathletes of Spain